Louis Destremps may refer to:
 Louis G. Destremps (1851–1930), Canadian-born American architect
 Louis E. Destremps (1875–?), Canadian-born American architect